West District and East District Busan is a constituency in Busan represented in the National Assembly of the Republic of Korea. It is one of the 253 constituencies that elects one assembly member by the first past the post system of election, and was created before the 2016 South Korean legislative election. It is currently represented by Yu Gu-jun of the United Future Party. He represented West District Busan, one of the seats predecessor seats from 2004 to 2016. Like most seats in Busan the seat and its predecessors have been safe seats for the United Future Party and its predecessor parties.

Location and History

The constituency represents the West District and East District near the traditional centre of Busan. The constituency surrounds the Central District and Yeong Island constituency.

The West District was previously its own constituency while the East District was in a constituency with the central district.

Elections

2020 South Korean legislative election

2016 South Korean legislative election

Saenuri Party win. New seat.

Turnout: 91,134/181,730 50.1%

Assembly Members

Opinion polls

2020

RN Research 5–6 April

References 

Constituencies of the National Assembly (South Korea)
Busan